Snapdragon is a 1993 film directed by Worth Keeter. It stars the former Playboy Playmate Pamela Anderson and was her first starring film role after the success of her Playboy layouts.

Plot summary 
When two men are killed after meeting up with an unknown prostitute, Sergeant Peckham is sent from vice squad to homicide to investigate. She has her boyfriend, police psychologist David Stratton, assist her in profiling the murderer. Soon they both become involved with Felicity, an amnesiac who keeps having a recurring nightmare where she kills her lovers. They both soon start to suspect that Felicity is connected to the murders they are investigating.

Cast 
 Steven Bauer as Dr. David 'Doc' Hoogstraten
 Chelsea Field as Peckham
 Pamela Anderson as Felicity
 Matt McCoy as Bernie
 Kenneth Tigar as Captain
 Larry Manetti as Lengle
 Rance Howard as Priest
 Gloria LeRoy as Nurse (Credited as Gloria Le Roi)
 Drew Snyder as Coroner
 Diana Lee Hsu as Professor Huan
 Irene Tsu as Hua
 Michael Monks as Grosky
 John F. O'Donohue as Fat Man
 Phillip Troy Linger as Mental Patient

Reception
The review aggregator Rotten Tomatoes, with no critics' reviews, does not rate the film. Audiences give the film a 21% rating, based on 929 reviews, with an average rating of 2.4/5. Karl Williams of The New York Times wrote, "This erotic psychological thriller marks the feature film debut of popular actress Pamela Anderson in a leading role. Felicity (Anderson) doesn't fit the psychological profile, and her bombshell beauty is having an intoxicating effect on David."

References

External links 
 
 

1993 films
1990s English-language films
1990s psychological thriller films
American psychological thriller films
Films directed by Worth Keeter
1990s American films
Films about amnesia